Jimmy Eriksson (born 14 March 1991 in Tomelilla) is a Swedish race car driver who drove in the GP2 Series for Arden International in the 2016 GP2 Series

Career

Karting
Eriksson made his karting debut in 2005, at the age of fourteen. In 2008 he was champion of the Swedish Formula Yamaha Championship.

Formula Renault
Eriksson began his car racing career by driving in the Formula Renault 2.0 Northern European Cup with Motopark Academy in 2009. He took a victory at Alastaro Circuit along with fourteen point-scoring positions to finish sixteenth in championship. Also he competed in some races of Formula Renault 2.0 NEZ, Formula Renault 2.0 Sweden and Eurocup Formula Renault 2.0, all with Motopark.

Formula Three

In 2010, Eriksson stepped up to the German Formula Three Championship with the Motopark Academy team. finishing sixth in points. He moved to the Formula 3 Euro Series in 2011, finishing ninth. The Swede returned to German Formula Three in 2012, winning the championship with 8 wins and 17 podiums in 27 races.

GP3 Series
In 2013, Eriksson progressed to GP3 Series, scoring no points for Status Grand Prix. In 2014 he joined Koiranen GP, ranking fourth in the drivers' championship. Continuing with Koiranen in 2015, the driver finished fifth in points.

GP2 Series
On 29 April 2016, he was announced at driving at the GP2 Series for Arden International. He scored points once at the Austria feature race with a fifth-place finish, but missed the final two rounds due to financial setbacks.

GT racing
In 2017, Eriksson was signed by HTP Motorsport to drive a Mercedes-AMG GT3 at the Blancpain GT Series Sprint Cup. Partnering with Dominik Baumann, he finished fifth at the Misano feature race, and seventh at the Hungary feature race.

Personal life
Eriksson's younger brother, Joel Eriksson, is also a racing driver, and most recently raced in Formula E in 2021.

Racing career

Career summary

† As Eriksson was a guest driver, he was ineligible for points.

Complete Formula 3 Euro Series results
(key)

Complete GP3 Series results
(key) (Races in bold indicate pole position) (Races in italics indicate fastest lap)

† Driver did not finish, but was classified as he completed 90% of the race distance.

Complete European Le Mans Series results

Complete GP2 Series results
(key) (Races in bold indicate pole position) (Races in italics indicate fastest lap)

† Driver did not finish, but was classified as he completed 90% of the race distance.

Complete Blancpain GT Series Sprint Cup results

References

External links

 
 

1991 births
Living people
People from Tomelilla Municipality
Swedish racing drivers
Formula Renault Eurocup drivers
Formula Renault 2.0 NEC drivers
Nordic Formula Renault 2.0 drivers
Sweden Formula Renault 2.0 drivers
German Formula Three Championship drivers
Formula Renault 2.0 NEZ drivers
Formula 3 Euro Series drivers
Swedish GP3 Series drivers
GP2 Series drivers
European Le Mans Series drivers
24H Series drivers
Arden International drivers
Sportspeople from Skåne County
Blancpain Endurance Series drivers
ADAC GT Masters drivers
Motopark Academy drivers
Status Grand Prix drivers
Koiranen GP drivers
Team Rosberg drivers
Mercedes-AMG Motorsport drivers
Performance Racing drivers
Double R Racing drivers